George Thomas Cottrell (third ¼ 1881 – first ¼ 1963), also known by the nickname of "Rocky", was an English rugby union and professional rugby league footballer who played in the 1900s and 1910s.

Background
George Cottrell's birth was registered in Cheltenham district, Gloucestershire, England. and his death was registered in Hull district, East Riding of Yorkshire, England.

Rugby union playing career

Notable tour matches
George Cottrell played in Cheltenham's 0-18 defeat by The Original All Blacks during the 1905–1906 New Zealand tour in Europe and North America at Athletic and Recreation Ground, Cheltenham on Wednesday 6 December 1905.

Rugby league playing career

Championship final appearances
George Cottrell played in Halifax's 18-3 victory Oldham in the Championship Final during the 1906–07 season.

Challenge Cup Final appearances
George Cottrell played right-, i.e. number 3, in Hull FC's 0-14 defeat by Hunslet in the 1908 Challenge Cup Final during the 1907–08 season at Fartown Ground, Huddersfield on Saturday 25 April 1908, in front of a crowd of 18,000, played left-, i.e. number 4, in the 0-17 defeat by Wakefield Trinity in the 1909 Challenge Cup Final during the 1908–09 season at Headingley Rugby Stadium, Leeds on Saturday 24 April 1909, in front of a crowd of 23,587. played , i.e. number 2, in Hull FC's 7-7 draw with Leeds in the 1910 Challenge Cup Final during the 1909–10 season at Fartown Ground, Huddersfield, on Saturday 16 April 1910, in front of a crowd of 19,413, this was the first Challenge Cup Final to be drawn, he played , i.e. number 2, in the 12-26 defeat by Leeds in the 1910 Challenge Cup Final replay at Fartown Ground, Huddersfield, on Monday 18 April 1910, in front of a crowd of 11,608.

Club career
George Cottrell transferred from Cheltenham All Saints RFC (associated with All Saints' Church, Cheltenham) to Cheltenham RFC, he changed rugby football codes from rugby union to rugby league when he transferred from Cheltenham RFC to Halifax during August 1906, he transferred from Halifax to Hull F.C. on 13 July 1907, he transferred from Hull F.C. to Keighley during June 1914.

References

External links

Search for "Cottrell" at rugbyleagueproject.org
Search for "George Cottrell" at britishnewspaperarchive.co.uk
Search for "George Thomas Cottrell" at britishnewspaperarchive.co.uk
Search for "Rocky Cottrell" at britishnewspaperarchive.co.uk

1881 births
1963 deaths
English rugby league players
English rugby union players
Gloucestershire County RFU players
Halifax R.L.F.C. players
Hull F.C. players
Keighley Cougars players
Rugby league centres
Rugby league players from Gloucestershire
Rugby league wingers
Rugby union centres
Rugby union fullbacks
Rugby union players from Cheltenham